Ionuț Costinel Mazilu (born 9 February 1982) is a Romanian former footballer, currently a manager. He is known in Romania for his sharp finishing, pace and technique.

Career

Club
Mazilu started his career at Sportul Studențesc in 1999. In the 2005–06 season, he was the leading goalscorer in the Romanian Liga I scoring 22 goals. The following season, he was taken to FC Rapid București, where he played for two years playing 34 games and scoring 18 goals. On 12 January 2008, Mazilu was transferred to the Ukrainian club FC Dnipro Dnipropetrovsk for a fee of €4 million, the highest fee received by a Romanian football club at that time. He failed to make an immediate impact. During his first year he only played eight games with a single goal scored. In 2009, he was loaned to FC Arsenal Kyiv after his transfer to CFR Cluj failed.

International career
Mazilu is a regular member of the Romania national football team since the 2004–05 season having played 12 matches and scored 3 goals.

International goals
Romania's goal tally first.

Honours

Club
Sportul Studențesc
 Liga II: 2000–01
Rapid București
 Cupa României: 2006–07
 Supercupa României: 2007

Individual
Divizia A Golden Boot : 2005–06

References

External links
 
 
 

1982 births
Living people
Romanian footballers
Romania international footballers
Association football forwards
Liga I players
FC Sportul Studențesc București players
FC Rapid București players
Ukrainian Premier League players
FC Dnipro players
FC Arsenal Kyiv players
Romanian expatriate footballers
Romanian expatriate sportspeople in Ukraine
Expatriate footballers in Ukraine
Romanian football managers
FC Sportul Studențesc București managers